Gama Aviation (AIM:GMAA) is a British business aviation services company specialising in providing aviation support for individuals, corporations and government agencies. The company has two service divisions: Air and Ground. It was founded in 1983 by Marwan Khalek and Stephen Wright, who function as CEO and Executive Director. Sir Ralph Robins, who formerly served on the board for Rolls-Royce, is the group's chairman.

Air division

Air services 
Since 1983, the company's managed fleet has increased through organic growth and mergers and acquisitions, including the reverse takeover of Hangar8, the acquisition of Aviation Beauport, and most recently the merger of its US Air division with that of BBA Aviation.

Further specialist services were added with the addition of FlyerTech, the organic development of flight training services and its own in-house pilot ground school.

The Scottish Air Ambulance Services (SAS) contract involves the provision of fixed-wing aircraft and helicopters, as well as the coordination and operational management of all flights.
This long-term contract resulted in the company investing in the development of new infrastructure at Glasgow Airport, with the creation of the SCOTSTAR facility.

In the USA, the company provides similar turnkey support for private aviation membership club Wheels Up. The business currently provides all operational support, pilots and pilot training for a fleet of King Air 350i and Cessna Citation XLS aircraft.

Ground division

Ground services 
Gama Aviation conducts maintenance support for a variety of business aircraft types across its network of bases.

The company also provides fleet support. In the US, this extends to the aircraft of Wheels Up utilising Textron Aviation's Citation XLS+ and the Beech King Air. In January 2017, the company's Europe Ground division announced a 15 aircraft fleet deal with Wijet to provide maintenance support across Europe for AOG, line and base maintenance.

As with the Air division, the company operates a number of contracts with the likes of NHS Scotland, the Ministry of Defence, and primary contractors such as Atkins. This has included updates to the Royal Air Force primary trainer fleet and the Army Air Corps Gazelle fleet, amongst others.

Geographic development of the ground division 
Gama Aviation has built a network of bases in the US (Bedford HF, Bridgeport, Chicago, Dallas, Las Vegas, Palm Beach, St. Louis, Teterboro, Van Nuys, White Plains) and UK (Farnborough, Aberdeen, Fairoaks, Glasgow, Jersey, Kennington, Doncaster, Waddington, Oxford). Additional maintenance facilities have also been added in Nice (France), Sharjah (UAE) and most recently Hong Kong.

Controversies 
, Gama is facing a High Court claim brought against it by Dustin Dryden, CEO of Hangar8, for £6.1million. The counterclaim is a reaction to an allegation made against Dryden in November 2016, alleging that Gama Aviation provided services and spare parts to Dryden, who failed to pay. Dryden claimed in response that the work was not performed properly and some of the spare parts had been pledged to another company.

Dryden claimed that, rather than a dispute over his conduct as director, there had been a "departure agreement" including a promise to sell his 5% stake in Gama and spend the proceeds with the company in order to help it hit second-half financial targets in 2015. Gama also attempted to impound one of Dryden's planes, which they claim Dryden unlawfully seized back. Dryden admitted to taking the jet back, but denied any legal wrongdoing.

Gama Aviation informed investors only after the suit was made public by newspapers, making an announcement to the London stock exchange. Its share price fell shortly afterwards. In response to the allegations made by Dryden, Gama Aviation announced that it would not comment while legal action was ongoing, but did release a background statement. Following this, Gama took out an injunction, forbidding newspapers from naming most of its clients. The cases will be heard next June.

A further case was brought against Gama Aviation by Credit Suisse. The bank filed a High Court claim stating that Gama had not turned over a private jet that Credit Suisse was entitled to sell after Challenger-Mondel, who financed the purchase of the aircraft, defaulted on a loan. In addition to this, the millionaire Andre Serruys has also taken action, alleging that the company overbilled him and performed sub-standard technical upgrades while under the management and maintenance control of Hangar8. 
, Gama is potentially exposed to $15.3million in damages from claimants.

References

External links 

Airlines of Switzerland
Airlines established in 1983
Swiss companies established in 1983